The Twelve Grapes (Sp. , "the twelve grapes of luck") is a Spanish tradition that consists of eating a grape with each of the twelve clock bell strikes at midnight of December 31 to welcome the New Year. Each grape and clock bell strike represents each of the coming twelve months.

This tradition dates back from at least 1895 but was consolidated among the population in 1909. In December of that year, some Alicantese vine growers spread this custom to better sell huge numbers of grapes from an excellent harvest. According to the tradition, eating the Twelve Grapes leads to a year of good luck and prosperity. In some areas, this practice was also believed to ward off witches and evil in general, although today it is mostly followed as a tradition to celebrate and welcome the New Year.

There are two types of places where people gather to eat the grapes: at home with family members after Nochevieja dinner, or in the main squares around the country, with the most famous being the Puerta del Sol in Madrid (and where this tradition started). The Twelve Grapes are closely related to the time ball and clock of the Royal House of the Post Office in Puerta del Sol, from where the change of year is broadcast on all major TV networks in Spain, including Televisión Española since 1962.

The Twelve Grapes have also been adopted in places with a broad cultural relation with Spain and Latin American countries, as well as Hispanic communities in countries such as the United States. This tradition is part of the Hispanic Christmas festivities.

References

External links
 

New Year celebrations
Spanish traditions
Viticulture